TramVallès, Tramvallès or Tramvia del Vallès is a proposed tram or light rail network in the metropolitan area of Barcelona (Catalonia, Spain). Its name stems from the region of Vallès, which spans two counties north of the Catalan capital. The region is densely populated, includes the Autonomous University of Barcelona and current public transport services are insufficient for commuters. Following expressions of citizen support, the Generalitat de Catalunya, the governing body of Catalonia, approved the project in 2010. Tramvallès would serve the following municipalities: Montcada i Reixac, Ripollet, Cerdanyola del Vallès, Badia del Vallès, Sant Cugat del Vallès, Barberà del Vallès, Sabadell and Terrassa.

The project
The first draft approved by the Generalitat de Catalunya is a 10 km stretch between Montcada i Reixac towards the Autonomous University of Barcelona in Bellaterra (Cerdanyola del Vallès). However, Plataforma pel Tramvallès demands a 32 km system to be implemented in the area, as proposed by the Plataforma per la Promoció del Transport Públic.

The line as proposed by Generalitat de Catalunya

The line as proposed by Plataforma per la Promoció del Transport Públic

See also
 Transport in Montcada i Reixac
 Autoritat del Transport Metropolità
 Metropolitan area of Barcelona
 Trambaix
 Trambesòs
 Tramvia Blau

References

Proposed rail infrastructure in Spain
Railway lines in Catalonia
Transport in Vallès Occidental